Falda Union is a union of Bhuapur Upazila, Tangail District, Bangladesh. It is situated 34 km north of Tangail.

Demographics
According to the Population Census 2011 performed by Bangladesh Bureau of Statistics, the total population of Falda Union is 21,497. There are 5,728 households in total.

Education
The literacy rate of Falda Union is 46.1% (Male-49.3%, Female-43.2%).

See also
 Union Councils of Tangail District

References

Populated places in Dhaka Division
Populated places in Tangail District
Unions of Bhuapur Upazila